Harry Aloysius Hanebrink (November 12, 1927 – September 9, 1996) was an American professional baseball backup second baseman/left fielder, who played in Major League Baseball (MLB) for the Milwaukee Braves (1953, 1957–1958) and Philadelphia Phillies (1959).

Career
In a four-season big league career, Hanebrink was a .224 hitter (71-for-317), with six home runs, and 25 runs batted in (RBI), in 177 games, including seven doubles, two triples, and one stolen base.

Hanebrink made his MLB debut on May 3, 1953.  He was a member of the Braves team that lost the 1958 World Series to the New York Yankees.

After baseball
Hanebrink, a native of St. Louis, Missouri, was a United States Navy World War II veteran. He was a real estate broker for about 20 years with Dolan Realtors in St. Louis and a shuttle bus driver for QuickPark at Lambert Field, from 1992 until his death. On September 9, 1996, Hanebrink died in Bridgeton, Missouri, at the age of 68 from an aneurysm.

References

External links

Harry Hanebrink at SABR (Baseball BioProject)

1927 births
1996 deaths
Milwaukee Braves players
Philadelphia Phillies players
Atlanta Crackers players
Buffalo Bisons (minor league) players
Eau Claire Bears players
Evansville Braves players
Hartford Chiefs players
Toledo Mud Hens players
Wichita Braves players
Major League Baseball left fielders
Major League Baseball outfielders
Baseball players from Missouri
United States Navy personnel of World War II
Deaths from aneurysm